WEEG (90.7 FM) was a radio station serving the eastern Long Island area from May 2010 until October 2011. It broadcast on FM frequency 90.7 MHz and was under ownership of the Hamptons Community Radio Corporation. This station was operated under a construction permit with program test authority as their radio station facility was built.

Hamptons Community Radio Corporation had a license to simulcast from Westhampton, New York (89.1 FM) with the assigned call sign WEEW.  They also had a license to operate on 90.7 FM in East Hampton however it did not have a tower and was required to get tower access by October 2011 or lose the license for the frequency.  It ceased operations at 8 a.m. on October 1, 2011. To operate on the 90.7 frequency it would have shared it with WEGB.  The shared time agreement called for WEEG to take about 9 hours every weekday and all of Saturday while WEGB got most of the weekdays plus all of Sunday. Both these stations operated with a directional pattern to protect New York City's WFUV, also operating on 90.7 MHz.

History 
This station received its original construction permit from the Federal Communications Commission on October 21, 2008. This permit was scheduled to expire on October 21, 2011.

The station was assigned the WEER call letters by the FCC on November 3, 2008.

Hamptons Community Radio Corporation was a non-profit 501c3 (IRS designation) entity governed by a five-member Board of Directors. It is also registered with the New York State Attorney General's office to accept donations.

In 2007 HCRC applied for three frequencies over which to broadcast: 90.7 in East Hampton, which the FCC approved subject to a time-sharing agreement with Community Bible Church, and 91.7 and/or 89.1 in the Riverhead area. In June 2010 the FCC approved 89.1 (licensed to Westhampton), which must be constructed by 2013. The callsign assigned was WEEW. The 91.7 frequency was granted to another applicant, and HCRC chose not to pursue an appeal of the FCC's decision.

Thus the station had two full-time frequencies (88.7 and 89.1, and a shared-time station 90.7), However, all the stations were identified as WEER East End Radio, except for the hourly legal IDs. As a "community" station, the entity relies heavily on local volunteers.

The station was conceived at a time when Long Island University was reported to be looking to sell its National Public Radio affiliated station WLIU (now WLIW-FM) in Southampton, New York.  That station became locally owned in December 2010 giving the Hamptons at the time two nonprofit radio stations that competed for the same money base.

WEER came on the air over Memorial Day weekend in May 2010.  It took over the repeater signal of WPKN paying it $60,000 for the signal and taking over the $4,000/month tower rental.  The station's plans to broadcast from studios in Bridgehampton, New York were delayed because dry rot was discovered in its planned facility.  It went on the air broadcasting from Southold, New York, with plans to return its studio to South Fork, Long Island by the end of Summer 2010.

The founder was Barbara Barri, a former announcer for KZLA (now KLLI) in Los Angeles, California. Ms. Barri continued as President, Executive Director, Station Manager, Program & News Director, Music Director, and a member of the Board. Peter Mundo was Sports Director, and also doubles as Director of Marketing.

On June 16, 2011, the station had its call sign changed to "WPKM" then again on June 23, 2011, to "WEEG". The station closed at 8 a.m., October 1, 2011  After the construction permit was allowed to expire, the station was deleted from the FCC's database on October 24, 2011.

References 

EEG
Defunct community radio stations in the United States
Defunct radio stations in the United States
Radio stations established in 2010
Radio stations disestablished in 2011
East Hampton (town), New York
Mass media in Suffolk County, New York
2010 establishments in New York (state)
2011 disestablishments in New York (state)
EEG